Adam Franz Prince of Schwarzenberg (25 September 1680, Linz – 11 June 1732, near Brandeis on the Elbe), 3rd Prince of Schwarzenberg, was a Bohemian nobleman from the Schwarzenberg family and Austrian Obersthofmarschall.

Biography
His parents were Ferdinand, 2nd Prince of Schwarzenberg (1652–1703) and Countess Maria Anna von Sulz (1653–1698).

He became the 3rd Prince of Schwarzenberg in 1703. He had the rooms of Tiengen Castle redecorated and also the Protivín castle converted into a baroque building. He acquired the Palais Schwarzenberg in Vienna in 1716. 
He became K.K. Chamberlain and Geheimrat, and from 1711 to 1722 he held the office of Obersthofmarschall. From 1722 until his death in 1732 he was Oberststallmeister. He was also awarded with the Order of the Golden Fleece.

Schwarzenberg was made Duke of Krumlov on 28 September 1723. 

On 12 June 1732, he was invited by Emperor Charles VI to hunt deer on the imperial estates near Brandeis. He was shot by mistake by the Emperor when the latter aimed his rifle at a deer and Prince Adam Franz got into the line of fire. Prince Adam Franz died the following day from his serious injuries. The deceased was buried on 25 June 1732 in the family crypt in the Augustinian Church in Vienna.

Marriage and children
He was married to Eleonore Elisabeth Amalia Magdalena von Lobkowicz (1682–1741).
They had 2 children.
Prince Joseph I Adam of Schwarzenberg (15 December 1722 – 17 February 1782), 4th Prince of Schwarzenberg, married on 22 August 1741 in Mariaschein near Teplice with Maria Theresia von und zu Liechtenstein (28 December 1721 – 19 January 1753) 
Maria Anna of Schwarzenberg (25 December 1706 – 12 January 1755) married in 1721 with Margrave Louis George, Margrave of Baden-Baden (1702–1761)

Sources
 the article in the German Wikipedia, Adam Franz Karl (Schwarzenberg).''
 BLKÖ:Schwarzenberg, Adam Franz Karl Fürst

1680 births
1732 deaths
18th-century Austrian people
Austrian Empire politicians
Adam Franz
Bohemian nobility
German Bohemian people
Hunting accident deaths
Deaths by firearm in the Czech Republic
Accidental deaths in the Czech Republic
Firearm accident victims